Margaret Vera Cobb (1884-1963) was an educational psychologist. She was elected a fellow of the American Association for the Advancement of Science in 1925.

Education and career 
Cobb was born in Easthampton, Massachusetts, in 1884. She received her bachelor's degree at Radcliffe College, where she graduated with distinction in 1910. At her graduation, the graduation speaker was Frederick Perry Fish who spoke on how "women's specialization was the home". In 1913 she earned an M.A. from the University of Illinois. Cobb also did research at the University of Michigan and the Marine Biological Laboratory. In 1981 she joined the United States Army to work in the Army Medical Department.

From 1922 until 1928, she worked in public schools in New York City teaching gifted children, which was described in a full-page article about her work in 1924. She was entered in the 1949 edition of American Men of Science.

Cobb died in Concord, New Hampshire, on November 19, 1963.

Work 
Cobb's work centered on psychology where she conducted studies on intelligence, specially the use of intelligence tests. In one of her studies, Cobb conducted a statistical analysis on the Medical Corps officers of the U.S. Army and found that they were of a lower intellectual status in general than the other branches of the Army. While they contributed this to the urgent necessity of Army medical officers during World War I and the increased average age of said officers, she concluded that analysis and considered other testing or more educational training that should done for entrance into medical school and the profession. Another article by Cobb found that how well a child could do simple mathematical calculations such as addition, subtraction, multiplication, and division correlated strongly with how well their parent could do the same activities. After controlling for environmental confounds, Cobb attributed her results to hereditary inheritance.

Awards and honors 
Cobb was named a fellow of the American Association for Advancement of Science in 1925.

Publications

References 

1884 births
1963 deaths
Radcliffe College alumni
University of Illinois alumni
Educational psychologists
Women psychologists
Fellows of the American Association for the Advancement of Science